The Edinburg Bobcats were a minor league baseball franchise based in Edinburg, Texas in 1926 and 1927. The Edinburg Bobcats played as members of the Class D level Gulf Coast League in 1926, winning the league championship and the 1927 Texas Valley League. Edinburg hosted minor league home games exclusively at the Edinburg High School Field.

History
The "Edinburg Bobcats" were formed during the 1926 season and won the league championship. On August 24, 1926, the Victoria Rosebuds of the Class D level Gulf Coast League, moved to Edinburg. Victoria had a 46–37 record at the time of the move and had won the first–half championship. The existing Victoria players reportedly did not make the move to Edinburg. The Victoria/Edinburg team ended the regular season with a record of 51–48 overall, placing 2nd in the four–team league under managers Bart Cahill and Cam Hill, finishing 3.5 games behind the 1st place Laredo Oilers in the final regular season standings. Laredo won the second–half championship. In the playoffs the Victoria Rosebuds/Edinburg Bobcats defeated the Beeville Bees/Laredo Oilers team 4 games to 3, to win the championship.

The Edinburg Bobcats continued play in a newly named league in 1927. The Texas Valley League formed as a four–team Class D level league, evolving from the 1926 Gulf Coast League, with the Corpus Christi Seahawks, Edinburg Bobcats, Laredo Oilers and Mission Grapefruiters continuing play. All four teams had finished the previous season as the only members of the 1926 Gulf Coast League. The Texas Valley League began play on April 5, 1927. With a record of 57–58, Edinburg placed 3rd in the overall standings under managers Roy Morton and Cam Hill, finishing 4.0 games behind 1st place Mission. Edinburg missed the playoffs, as the Corpus Christi Seahawks won the first–half standings and Laredo won the second–half standings to play in the Finals (where Corpus Christi defeated Laredo).

Edinburg did not return to play in 1928. The Texas Valley League continued play as a four–team league, as the Mission Grapefruiters and Corpus Christi Seahawks were joined by new teams from Brownsville, Texas and McAllen, Texas. The Texas Valley League folded after the 1928 season.

Edinburg, Texas was without minor league baseball until the 2001 Edinburg Roadrunners began play as members of the Independent level Texas-Louisiana League.

The ballpark

The Edinburg Bobcats played home games exclusively at the Edinburg High School Field. The Edinburg High School Field was located on the campus of the Edinburg Senior High School & Junior College, located "downtown" at the time. The ballpark  was noted for having a short right field line. Today, Edinburg High School is located at 2600 East Wisconsin Road, Edinburg, Texas.

Timeline

Year–by–year records

Notable alumni
Cliff Garrison (1927)

References

External links
Baseball Reference

Defunct minor league baseball teams
Professional baseball teams in Texas
Defunct baseball teams in Texas
Baseball teams established in 1926
Baseball teams disestablished in 1927
Florida Complex League teams
Texas Valley League teams
Edinburg, Texas